The Oktaves is a Filipino rock supergroup formed in 2011 consisting of Ely Buendia (of Eraserheads, Pupil, and The Mongols), Nitoy Adriano (of The Jerks), and Hilera members Chris Padilla, Ivan Garcia, and Bobby Padilla. The band was named after the music term "Octave", which is the interval between one musical pitch and another with half or double its frequency. This principle also mirrors the age and experience of its band members spread through three decades of Filipino music, whereas Adriano began during the 1970s, while Buendia began during the 1980s, and the rest of the younger band members began during the 1990s. Buendia also collaborated with The Jerks and Hilera on different independent projects, which also prompted him to form the band.

The band's self-titled debut album, The Oktaves, was released on 2013 through MCA Music.

Discography

Studio albums
The Oktaves (MCA, 2013)

Awards and nominations

Awit Awards

|-
|rowspan=2|2013
|rowspan=2|"KPL"
|Best Rock/Alternative Recording
|
|-
|Best Performance by a New Group Recording Artists
|
|}

MYX Music Awards

|-
|2015
|"Ikot"
|Favorite Rock Video
|
|}

References

Filipino rock music groups
Musical groups from Metro Manila
Musical groups established in 2011
Rock music supergroups
2011 establishments in the Philippines